The Faucette Building is a historic commercial building at 4th and Main Streets in North Little Rock, Arkansas.  It is a two-story masonry structure, with three storefronts, and a false parapet above the second floor.  It was built in 1890 by William Faucette, one of the leading citizens of the unincorporated area of Argenta.  The area was annexed to Little Rock in the 1890s, and it was Faucette who engineered the formation of North Little Rock in the early 20th century.

The building was listed on the National Register of Historic Places in 1978.  It is also a contributing property to the commercial section of the Argenta Historic District.

See also
National Register of Historic Places listings in Pulaski County, Arkansas

References

Commercial buildings on the National Register of Historic Places in Arkansas
Buildings and structures completed in 1891
Buildings and structures in North Little Rock, Arkansas
National Register of Historic Places in Pulaski County, Arkansas
Historic district contributing properties in Arkansas